Sir Thomas Lowther, 2nd Baronet (20 April 1699 – 23 March 1745) was an English landowner, dwelling at Marske Hall, Yorkshire. He was the only son of Sir William Lowther, 1st Baronet and Catherine Preston.

On 2 July 1723, he married Lady Elizabeth Cavendish, daughter of William Cavendish, 2nd Duke of Devonshire, and had one son:
Sir William Lowther, 3rd Baronet (1727–1756)

He was thought to be the probable legatee of Sir James Lowther, 4th Baronet, and his alcoholism was concealed from Sir James by the rest of the family for fear he would be disinherited. In the event, Sir James survived him by a decade.

References

 familysearch.org Retrieved 3 November 2007

1699 births
1745 deaths
Baronets in the Baronetage of England
Members of the Parliament of Great Britain for English constituencies
English landowners
Thomas
British MPs 1722–1727